Johannes Huebl (born December 22, 1977) is a German model, photographer and designer.

Personal life 

He is married to American socialite Olivia Palermo.

References

1977 births
Living people